Seneca County Courthouse Complex at Ovid, also known as the "Three Bears," is a historic courthouse complex located at Ovid in Seneca County, New York.  The 1845 courthouse, known as "Papa Bear," is a -story, three-by-four-bay, Neoclassical brick structure with a monumental frame pedimented portico supported by four Doric order columns and topped by a cupola. The "Old" Clerk's Office, known as "Mama Bear," was also constructed in 1845 and is similar in design and construction.  The "New" Clerk's Office, known as "Baby Bear," was constructed about 1860 and is also of the same, simple Doric design.

It was listed on the National Register of Historic Places in 1976.

References

External links
Waterloo and Ovid Court Houses, Seneca County, NY USGenWeb Project Site

Courthouses on the National Register of Historic Places in New York (state)
County courthouses in New York (state)
Buildings and structures in Seneca County, New York
National Register of Historic Places in Seneca County, New York
Former courthouses in New York (state)